State Road 573 (NM 573) is a  state highway in the US state of New Mexico. NM 573's southern terminus is at NM 162 in Tierra Amarilla, and the northern terminus is a continuation as County Route 331 (CR 331) at the intersection of CR 327 north of Tierra Amarilla. CR 331 continues north to NM 512.

History

From the 1950s until 1988 NM 573 was originally NM 162. NM 573 was created in 1988 after NM 162's northern terminus was changed to its current location.

Major intersections

See also

References

External links

573
Transportation in Rio Arriba County, New Mexico